Sherwood is an unincorporated community in McCurtain County, Oklahoma, United States. A post office opened in Sherwood on March 20, 1912. The community was named for early settler Sherwood Davis.

References

Unincorporated communities in McCurtain County, Oklahoma
Unincorporated communities in Oklahoma